Metallolophia arenaria is a moth of the family Geometridae first described by John Henry Leech in 1889. It is found in China (Hunan, Zhejiang, Yunnan, Fujian, Jiangxi, Sichuan) and Taiwan.

References

Moths described in 1889
Pseudoterpnini